Canada competed at the 2015 World Championships in Athletics in Beijing, China, from 22–30 August 2015.

Medalists 
The following competitors from Canada won medals at the Championships

Results

Men
Track and road events

Field events

Combined events – Decathlon

Women 
Track and road events

Field events

Combined events – Heptathlon

Key
Note–Ranks given for track events are within the athlete's heat only
Q = Qualified for the next round
q = Qualified for the next round as a fastest loser or, in field events, by position without achieving the qualifying target
NR = National record
PB = Personal best
N/A = Round not applicable for the event
Bye = Athlete not required to compete in round

References

Sources 
Provisional Canadian team named July 20
Athletics Canada official roster for the games.

Nations at the 2015 World Championships in Athletics
World Championships in Athletics
2015